The Underwater City is a 1962 American science fiction film in Eastmancolor, about overcoming engineering obstacles for establishing an underwater living environment. The film was directed by Frank McDonald, produced by Alex Gordon and written by Gordon's wife Ruth Alexander. Columbia Pictures released the film as a double feature with The Three Stooges Meet Hercules.

Plot

Dr. Halstead (Carl Benton Reid) of the Institute of Oceanography hires Bob Gage (William Lundigan) to supervise the construction of an underwater city. If humans are going to blow themselves sky-high at some point in the future, then it might be a good idea to have an escape hatch down at the bottom of the ocean. Gage falls in love with Dr. Halstead's niece, Dr. Monica Powers (Julie Adams). A series of underwater living units are carefully created and tested until it seems that they are ready for residents to move in. What no one considers is that the sea floor and the sea itself may not be as stable as expected.

Cast
 William Lundigan as Cmdr Bob Gage 
 Julie Adams as Dr. Monica Powers 
 Roy Roberts as Tim Graham 
 Carl Benton Reid as Dr. Junius Halstead 
 Chet Douglas as Chuck Marlow 
 Paul Dubov as George Burnett 
 Karen Norris as Phyllis Gatewood
 Kathie Browne as Dottie Steele

Production
Originally shown in black and white in the theaters, it was later released to television in color. The filming was fraught with conflict, leading to a lawsuit by Neptune Productions against Columbia Pictures.

Alex Gordon recalls that his wife was inspired by an article in American Weekly magazine about scientists growing food on the ocean floor. Gordon also recalled that the original choice for Dr Halstead, Raymond Massey was replaced when he couldn't arrive in time to commence production. The film was originally supposed to be the first of a six-picture deal with Columbia for Gordon but the deal was dropped.

Comic book adaptation
 Dell Four Color #1328 (1962)

References

External links
 
 
 
 

1960s science fiction films
1962 films
Columbia Pictures films
American science fiction films
Films adapted into comics
Films scored by Ronald Stein
Films with underwater settings
Films directed by Frank McDonald
1960s English-language films
1960s American films